Pitcairnia micropoda is a plant species in the genus Pitcairnia. This species is endemic to Mexico.

References

micropoda
Flora of Mexico